The Long Goodbye: LCD Soundsystem Live at Madison Square Garden is a live album by American rock band LCD Soundsystem released in 2014. It is a near-unedited live recording of their final show held at Madison Square Garden in 2011. At the time, this was billed as the band's final show ever.

Release
The album was released on Record Store Day 2014 as a limited edition 5-LP box set. This release has a dedicated mix overseen by James Murphy and mastered by Bob Weston that is advertised as "an entirely different mix to the movie".

Track listing
All songs written by James Murphy unless otherwise notated.

Personnel
LCD Soundsystem
James Murphy – vocals, percussion, synthesizer, organ, keyboards, piano, kalimba
Tyler Pope – bass, samples, synthesizer, percussion, organ
Pat Mahoney – drums, synth pads, vocals
Nancy Whang – synthesizer, vocals, piano, organ, samples, Wurlitzer
Rayna Russom – synthesizer, percussion, piano, Wurlitzer, clavinet, vocals, vocoder
Matthew Thornley – guitar, percussion, percussion [electronic percussion], bass, synthesizer, electric piano, samples
Al Doyle – guitar, vocals, percussion, synthesizer, bass, clavinet, trumpet, organ, glockenspiel
Gunnar Bjerk – synthesizer, programming

Additional musicians

Jam Rostron (credited as Janine Rostron), Lizzy Yoder, Shannon Funchess, Tiffany Roth – backing vocals
Mr. Dream and the State Street Singers – choir
Phil Mossman – guitar, vocals
David Scott Stone – guitar
Trevor Sellers – piano
Colin Stetson – saxophone
Carter Yasutake – trumpet
Kelly Pratt – trumpet
Nick Roseboro – trumpet
Alberto López – percussion
Reggie Watts – vocals
Juan Maclean, Shit Robot – vocoders
Jeremy Gara, Régine Chassagne, Will Butler, Win Butler – backing vocals

Production

Bob Weston – mastering
James Murphy – producer, mixing
Matthew Thornley – mix engineer
Gunnar Bjerk – mix engineer
Colt Steele – mix assistant
Josh Harris – mix assistant
Matthew Shaw – mix assistant
Nelson Nuñez – mix assistant
Christina Moon – recording
Steve Revitte – recording
Michael Vadino – art direction, design, photography
Ruvan Wijesooriya – photography
Vivan Thi Tang – photography

Charts

References

2014 live albums
LCD Soundsystem albums
Warner Records live albums
Parlophone live albums
Albums produced by James Murphy (electronic musician)
Albums recorded at Madison Square Garden
DFA Records albums